The Kuwait National Museum is the national museum of  Kuwait, located in Kuwait City. It was established in 1983 and designed by architect Michel Ecochard.

The museum comprises five buildings set around a central garden, their organization is parallel to the architectural plan of the vernacular Arab mud house with its central courtyard. The main buildings are connected to each other with elevated walkways. Ecochard explains that the grouping of those buildings corresponds to knowledge of the region, its
geography, its history and its civilization.

The museum has four main sections to it:
1. Kuwait Heritage Hall
2. Hall of Archeology
3. The Planetarium 
4. Al Muhallab Dhow

See also
 Kuwait National Cultural District
 Fateh Al-Khayr

References

1983 establishments in Kuwait
Buildings and structures in Kuwait City
Museums in Kuwait
Cultural centers in Kuwait